The Haber Slough is a slough in Richmond, California, formed by a creek of the same name that drains into the Richmond Inner Harbor, part of San Francisco Bay. It lies between modern tract housing in the Marina Bay neighborhood and the University of California, Berkeley Richmond Field Station's portion of Western Stege Marsh, which has been cleaned of legacy industrial contamination and restored to a productive tidal salt marsh home to the endangered California Ridgway's rail (Rallus obsoletus). The slough is across from Stege Marsh from which Baxter Creek drains across from a small bay they both form known as Campus Bay. The site is currently undergoing wetlands restoration.

External links 
 Panoramic image

References 

Bodies of water of Richmond, California
San Francisco Bay
Wetlands of the San Francisco Bay Area
Landforms of Contra Costa County, California
Marshes of California